The 1987 Women's Honda World Open Squash Championship was the women's edition of the 1987 World Open, which serves as the individual world championship for squash players. The event took place at the Henderson Squash Club and YMCA Stadium in Auckland in New Zealand between September 29 and October 6, 1987. Susan Devoy won her second World Open title, defeating Lisa Opie in a repeat of the 1985 final.

Seeds

Results

First round (29 Sep)

Second round (30 Sep)

Third round to final

Notes
Susan Devoy won her second World Open and would go on to win four in total.

References

External links
Womens World Open

1987 in squash
World Squash Championships
Squash tournaments in New Zealand
1987 in New Zealand sport
1987 in women's squash
International sports competitions hosted by New Zealand
1987 in New Zealand women's sport